The 42nd Nova Scotia general election will be held on or before 15 July 2025 to elect members to the 65th General Assembly of Nova Scotia. During the 2021 election, the Progressive Conservatives included a commitment in their platform to introduce fixed election dates in the province. Under amendments to the provincial Elections Act introduced and passed in October 2021, the first fixed election date following the 2021 Nova Scotia general election is set as 15 July 2025. All subsequent elections will take place on the third Tuesday in July of the fourth calendar year following the previous election.

Timeline

 17 August 2021 – The Progressive Conservative Association, led by Tim Houston, wins the 2021 Nova Scotia general election, the Liberal Party becomes the official opposition, and the New Democratic Party remains at third party status.
 23 October 2021 - Anthony Edmonds is elected leader and Jo-Ann Roberts is elected deputy leader of the Green Party of Nova Scotia. 
 9 November 2021 – Gary Burrill, leader of the Nova Scotia New Democratic Party, announces his resignation, triggering a leadership election for the party.
 16 December 2021 – Nova Scotians United becomes Nova Scotia's newest registered political party.
 5 January 2022 – Iain Rankin, leader of the Nova Scotia Liberal Party, announces his resignation, triggering a leadership election for the party.
 25 June 2022 – Claudia Chender is elected leader of the Nova Scotia New Democratic Party.
 9 July 2022 – Zach Churchill is elected leader of the Nova Scotia Liberal Party.
 25 January 2023 – Angela Simmonds, MLA for Preston and Deputy Speaker of the House, announces her intention the step-down, effective April 1, 2023.

Current standings

Opinion polls

Voting intentions in Nova Scotia since the 2021 election

References

Opinion poll sources 

Nova Scotia general election, 2025
2025
Nova Scotia